Geophilus richardi is a species of soil centipede in the family Geophilidae found in France, Italy, and the Ionian Islands. Females of this species have 33 pairs of legs; males have 29 or 31. This species is one of only two in the family Geophilidae to include centipedes with as few as 29 leg pairs. This species grows up to 10 millimeters long, has no carpophagus pit or pore-fields, and has a gradually tapering, curved pretarsus of the second maxillae. G. richardi lacks typical ventral pores between 2–4mm. The sternites instead bear a small number of pores between 0.5–1mm that differ from micropores, which are unbounded by a cuticular ring. These are possibly the remnants of typical ventral pores, their smaller size being a byproduct of overall miniaturization.

References 

richardi
Myriapods of Europe
Animals described in 1904
Taxa named by Henry Wilfred Brolemann